Barbara Lynette Bevege (25 November 1942 – 29 April 1999) was a New Zealand cricketer who played as a right-handed batter and right-arm medium bowler. She appeared in five Test matches and 16 One Day Internationals for New Zealand between 1973 and 1982. She mainly played domestic cricket for Wellington, as well as appearing once for Auckland.

She was the first woman to score both a Test century and a One Day International century for New Zealand. Her Test hundred came against India in Dunedin in 1976–77 while her One Day International (ODI) century came against International XI at the 1982 World Cup, when she put on 180 with Lesley Murdoch. She also set the record for the oldest woman to score her maiden ODI hundred, at the age of 39 years and 48 days. She scored 400 runs in Test match cricket at an average of 44.44. In One Day Internationals, she scored 488 runs at 32.53. She also took 3 for 17 against Australia, her only ODI wickets.

She died in 1999 after a long illness.

References

External links
 
 

1942 births
1999 deaths
Cricketers from Wellington City
New Zealand women cricketers
New Zealand women Test cricketers
New Zealand women One Day International cricketers
Auckland Hearts cricketers
Wellington Blaze cricketers